Gladrags is an Indian magazine, published biweekly featuring modeling and related events.

History and profile
Gladrags was established in 1959. The first issue appeared in July 1959. The magazine is owned by Maureen Wadia. It is primarily a women's magazine and features articles on relationships, beauty and fashion, travel, cuisine, and health and fitness. It also features articles on celebrities and cultural facets of Indian women.

Pageantry
It also organises beauty pageants such as
 Mrs. India
 Gladrags Manhunt and Megamodel Contest
 Gladrags Little Miss and Little Master

References

External links
 Official website

1959 establishments in Bombay State
Biweekly magazines published in India
Women's magazines published in India
Magazines established in 1959
Mass media in Mumbai
Multilingual magazines
Wadia Group